Brooks Island is an island in Raleigh County, West Virginia on the New River. It is located approximately two miles south of Brooks Falls near the unincorporated community of Brooks.

See also 
List of islands of West Virginia

River islands of West Virginia
Landforms of Raleigh County, West Virginia